Vasilije Janjičić (born 2 November 1998) is a Swiss footballer who plays as a midfielder for Celje.

Club career
Janjičić came through the youth academy of FC Zürich. In August 2016 he signed a four-year deal with Hamburger SV, where he debuted in the Bundesliga on 4 April 2017 against Borussia Dortmund.

After the 2018–19 season, he was excluded from the first team by new coach Dieter Hecking. On 27 August 2019, he signed a three-year contract with his youth club FC Zürich and returned to Switzerland.

Personal life
Janjičić is of Serb origin. In February 2018, Janjičić caused a car crash in the Elbtunnel while driving under the influence of alcohol and without a valid driving licence. In July 2020, he was diagnosed with cancer.

References

External links
 

1998 births
Living people
Footballers from Zürich
Swiss people of Serbian descent
Swiss men's footballers
Switzerland youth international footballers
Switzerland under-21 international footballers
Association football midfielders
Swiss expatriate footballers
Swiss expatriate sportspeople in Germany
Swiss expatriate sportspeople in Slovenia
Expatriate footballers in Germany
Expatriate footballers in Slovenia
FC Zürich players
Hamburger SV II players
Hamburger SV players
NK Celje players
Swiss Challenge League players
Regionalliga players
Bundesliga players
2. Bundesliga players
Swiss Super League players
Swiss Promotion League players
Slovenian PrvaLiga players